Graham Stephen Potter (born 20 May 1975) is an English professional football manager and former player who is the current head coach of  club Chelsea.

In a 13-year playing career, Potter, who played as a left-back, made 307 appearances in the Football League. He also played in the Premier League for Southampton and the Football Conference for Shrewsbury Town. At international level, he was capped once for England at under-21 level.

Potter started his professional managerial career in January 2011 with Swedish club Östersund. He won three promotions and the Svenska Cupen with Östersund, leading them to the 2017–18 UEFA Europa League knockout stage. He was appointed manager of Championship club Swansea City in June 2018, and moved on to Brighton & Hove Albion of the Premier League a year later. In 2022, he became the head coach of Chelsea.

Playing career

Born in Solihull, West Midlands, Potter began his footballing career at the age of 17 as a trainee at Birmingham City. After a loan spell at Wycombe Wanderers, the young left-back then moved on to Stoke City, then to Southampton in the Premier League, where he played in the famous 6–3 win over Manchester United in 1996. While a Southampton player, he was capped for England U21s in a European Championships qualifier against Moldova.

He joined West Bromwich Albion in 1997, and after three-and-a-half years, which also included loan spells at Northampton Town and Reading, he signed for York City. Potter moved from York City to Boston United in the summer of 2003. Potter would go on to make over 100 appearances for York City, before joining Shrewsbury Town on loan in November 2003. In the closing chapter of his playing career, in 2004, he moved on a free transfer to Macclesfield Town, where he finished his senior playing career.

Coaching and managerial career

Early career
With support from the Professional Footballers' Association, Potter graduated from the Open University in December 2005 with a degree in Social Sciences. He worked as a football development manager for the University of Hull and as technical director for the Ghana women's team at the 2007 FIFA Women's World Cup. He became assistant coach for the England Universities squad, before joining Leeds Metropolitan University (now Leeds Beckett University) in a similar role; while at Leeds, he completed an MSc Leadership: Personal & Professional Development, which focused on using emotional intelligence.

In 2008, Potter was appointed manager of Northern Counties East League Division One side Leeds Carnegie. During his time at the club, Potter led the team to the third round of the FA Vase and third place in the 2009–10 Northern Counties East League season, before departing Leeds Carnegie on 12 January 2011.

Östersund

In December 2010, Potter signed a three-year contract as coach of Östersund, who were then playing in the fourth tier of Swedish football, starting on 24 January 2011. Potter was offered the job after Graeme Jones, his friend and assistant to Roberto Martínez at Swansea City, recommended him to chairman Daniel Kindberg after Östersund's pre-season friendly with Swansea.

In 2013, after two successive promotions, Potter extended his contract with the club for another three years. On 27 October 2015, Östersund secured promotion to the Swedish top flight, Allsvenskan, for the first time in their history following a second-place finish in the 2015 Superettan. Östersund finished their debut season in eighth place, winning plaudits for their "slick passing game" and competing on a limited budget.

On 13 April 2017, Potter's Östersund team won the Svenska Cupen, beating Norrköping 4–1 in the final. This granted the team a place in the second qualifying round of the 2017–18 UEFA Europa League where they defeated Galatasaray 3–1 on aggregate. In the third round they defeated Fola Esch 3–1 on aggregate and in the play-offs they knocked out PAOK (3–3 on aggregate with more away goals), thus securing a historic entry into the Europa League group stage. They finished second in their group, level on points with Athletic Bilbao. Despite beating Arsenal 2–1 at the Emirates Stadium, they were eliminated from the competition after losing 4–2 on aggregate. Östersund finished their domestic league season in fifth place.

Swansea City

Potter was appointed manager of newly relegated Championship club Swansea City on 11 June 2018 on a three-year contract. He was joined by assistant manager Billy Reid and recruitment analyst Kyle Macaulay. On his appointment, Potter said "This is a Premier League club from the last seven years and it wants to try to get back, but get back in a way that there is an identity and an understanding of what they want to be on the pitch. That was the interesting thing for me – the chance to build something".

Potter won his first match as Swansea boss with a 2–1 victory over Sheffield United, with goals from striker Oli McBurnie and former Liverpool youngster Yan Dhanda. His first game at Swansea's Liberty Stadium was a 1–0 win against Preston North End. In his first season at the club, Swansea reached the quarter-finals of the 2018–19 FA Cup, where they hosted Manchester City. They led the Premier League champions 2–0 after 30 minutes, but three goals in the last 20 minutes, one from Bernardo Silva, an own goal from Kristoffer Nordfeldt and a late winner from Sergio Agüero defeated Potter's side. They finished 10th in the league, after a strong end-of-season run gave Swansea a slim chance of making the play-offs going into the last three matches of the season.

After Chris Hughton was dismissed as Brighton & Hove Albion manager at the end of the 2018–19 season, Brighton made an approach for Potter to become their new manager, which Swansea initially rejected. Swansea offered Potter a new contract to remain at the club, which would have made him one of the Championship's highest earning managers. However, the club eventually granted permission for Potter to begin talks with Brighton, who would reportedly pay Swansea about £3m in compensation for Potter and his backroom staff.

Brighton & Hove Albion

2019–20 season

Potter was appointed head coach of Premier League club Brighton & Hove Albion on 20 May 2019, signing a four-year contract. He won his first match 3–0 away to Watford, in what was also his Premier League debut. His first home game on 17 August was a 1–1 draw with West Ham United. Potter's first defeat in the league was a week later at Falmer Stadium, 2–0 to South Coast neighbours Southampton.

In the first game back after the COVID-19 league suspension, Brighton achieved their first league double over Arsenal following a 2–1 home victory on 20 June, having also won 2–1 in the reverse fixture earlier in the season. His first season saw the club recording their highest points and goals in the Premier League, collecting 41 points and scoring 39, while finishing in 15th (their joint highest finish with the 2017–18 season) after a 2–1 win over Burnley in the last game of the season.

2020–21 season

Brighton lost 3–1 at home to Chelsea in their opening game of the 2020–21 season. They won their first league match of the season in their second game, beating Newcastle away 3–0. Brighton lost 3–2 at home to Manchester United on 26 September; this was Potter's 100th defeat as a manager.

On 31 January 2021, Brighton beat Tottenham 1–0, their first league win at home since the victory over Arsenal on 20 June 2020. Three days later, Potter led Brighton to beat defending champions Liverpool 1–0 at Anfield for the first time in their history – it was also Brighton’s first league win at Liverpool since 1982. On 18 May, Brighton came from 2–0 down to defeat champions Manchester City 3–2 for their first league victory over the Sky Blues since 1989.
 
Potter's second year in charge of Brighton finished with a record-equalling points tally of 41 points, which they also achieved the season before. However, they finished in 16th, a place below the previous season. Brighton scored 40 goals in the Premier League, conceding 46, with a minus 6 goal difference and keeping 12 clean sheets, all being new club record statistics for Brighton in the Premier League.

2021–22 season

In Potter’s third season, Brighton came from behind to beat Burnley 2–1 at Turf Moor in the opening game of the season on 14 August. Potter's 100th game as Brighton manager – and 400th overall – came on 20 November, a 2–0 away defeat at Aston Villa. On 21 January 2022, it was announced that Potter had tested positive for COVID-19; first team coach Björn Hamberg instead took charge of Brighton’s game against Leicester City, a 1–1 away draw.

Potter's 100th Premier League match came on 15 February, a 2–0 away loss at Manchester United, ending Brighton's record-breaking unbeaten league run of seven games. He guided Brighton to their best ever points tally after a 3–0 away victory over Wolverhampton Wanderers on 30 April, with Brighton up to 44 points and sitting ninth in the league. A week later, Potter's Brighton beat Manchester United at the AMEX 4–0; the victory became Brighton's biggest top flight result.  

Brighton achieved their highest top flight finish after beating West Ham United 3–1 on the last game of the season, ending the campaign in ninth place with their highest Premier League goal tally of 42 and reaching 51 points, 10 points higher than their previous record of 41.

2022–23 season

Potter became the first Brighton manager to win at Old Trafford, after Brighton beat Manchester United 2–1 on the opening game of the 2022–23 season. On 4 September, Brighton beat Leicester City 5–2 at Falmer Stadium, the first time Brighton have scored five goals in a Premier League fixture.

On 8 September 2022, Brighton announced that Potter and five members of his backroom staff would depart the club for Chelsea. Chelsea reportedly paid Brighton around £16m for Potter and an additional £5.5m to £6.5m in compensation for his backroom staff.

He was succeeded at Brighton by Roberto De Zerbi.

Chelsea

On 8 September 2022, Potter was appointed the new head coach of Premier League club Chelsea on a five-year deal, replacing Thomas Tuchel. On his debut six days later, the team drew 1–1 at home to Red Bull Salzburg in the Champions League group stage. On 1 October, Potter won his first Chelsea match in his second game in charge, coming from behind to beat Crystal Palace 2–1 away from home. Pierre-Emerick Aubameyang and Chelsea graduate Conor Gallagher – who scored the 90th minute winner – scored their first goals for the club. His first loss came on 29 October in his tenth game, a heavy 4–1 away defeat on his first return to his previous club Brighton. 

After Chelsea's exit in the third round of the FA Cup for the first time since 1999 following a 4–0 defeat to Manchester City, Potter came under intense scrutiny from the fans and media due to the side's poor results and performances. On 18 February, after a home defeat to bottom of the table Southampton, a section of Chelsea fans called for Potter's resignation.

Managerial style

Potter has been recognised for his "progressive" and "unconventional" coaching methods. At Östersund, he encouraged his players and staff to engage in community activities, such as performing in theatre and music productions designed to take them out of their comfort zone.

Potter describes his teams as "tactically flexible, attacking, [and] possession-based". At Östersund, he deployed a flexible 3–5–2 formation centred on ball possession. Former Celtic and Barcelona player Henrik Larsson commented on Potter's pattern of play, stating he "played all different kinds of systems, starting off a match one way, and then halfway through they started playing a different system, and then they ended up with a third system. And all the players knew exactly what they were doing." At Swansea, Potter used ten different formations and his team completed the most passes per 90 minutes in the Championship.

As a young coach, Potter studied the training methods of Roberto Martínez at Swansea and became inspired by his possession-based approach, along with the "holistic" training principles he observed during his travels to Spain. Potter also cites the philosophy of Pep Guardiola and Raymond Verheijen's periodisation model among his influences. Guardiola admitted that he was a "big fan" of Potter, saying that Potter's "Brighton are a joy to watch, a joy to analyse" and that his "players move with freedom and everyone knows what they have to do. They have the courage to play everywhere."

BBC Sport published an article in October 2021 about Potter's rise as a manager and regarded him as a possible England manager in the making.

Personal life 
Potter is married to Rachel Potter. They have three sons.

Career statistics

Managerial statistics

Honours

As a manager
Östersund
Svenska Cupen: 2016–17
Division 1 Norra: 2012
Division 2 Norrland: 2011

Individual
Swedish Football Awards Manager of the Year: 2016, 2017
Swedish Sports Awards Coach of the Year: 2017

References

External links

1975 births
Living people
Sportspeople from Solihull
English footballers
England under-21 international footballers
Association football defenders
Birmingham City F.C. players
Wycombe Wanderers F.C. players
Stoke City F.C. players
Southampton F.C. players
West Bromwich Albion F.C. players
Northampton Town F.C. players
Reading F.C. players
York City F.C. players
Boston United F.C. players
Shrewsbury Town F.C. players
Macclesfield Town F.C. players
English Football League players
National League (English football) players
Premier League players
English football managers
Östersunds FK managers
Swansea City A.F.C. managers
Brighton & Hove Albion F.C. managers
Chelsea F.C. managers
English Football League managers
Premier League managers
English expatriate football managers
Expatriate football managers in Sweden
English expatriate sportspeople in Sweden
People associated with the University of Hull
Alumni of Leeds Beckett University
Alumni of the Open University